Ynys Lochtyn is an island found at the tip of the Lochtyn peninsula on the coast of Cardigan Bay, located 1.5 miles north east of the village of Llangrannog in the county of Ceredigion, Wales. Popular with tourists, it is accessible by the coastal path when walking towards New Quay.

References 

Islands of Ceredigion
Tidal islands of Wales